The 2005 Maryland Terrapins men's soccer team represented the University of Maryland, College Park during the 2005 NCAA Division I men's soccer season. It was the 60th season of the university fielding a program. The Terrapins were led by 13th year head coach, Sasho Cirovski.

The 2005 season was one of the program's best seasons in history, as they won their second NCAA National Championship in program history, and third claimed overall national championship in men's soccer. It was their first title since 1968.

Roster

Schedule 

|-
!colspan=8 style=""| Exhibitions

|-
!colspan=8 style=""| Regular season
|-

|}

References 

Maryland Terrapins men's soccer seasons
Maryland Terrapins
Maryland Terrapins men's soccer
Maryland Terrapins
Maryland
NCAA Division I Men's Soccer Tournament College Cup seasons
NCAA Division I Men's Soccer Tournament-winning seasons